Hartington may refer to:

Places
 Hartington, Derbyshire, a village in the Derbyshire Peak District, England
 Hartington railway station
 Hartington, Nebraska, a city in Cedar County, Nebraska, United States
 Hartington, Northumberland, England, a former civil parish, now in Rothley
 Hartington, Ontario, a small village in Canada

People
 Harry Hartington (1881–1950), English cricketer
 Marquess of Hartington, British Liberal Party leader, 1886–1903

Other
 Hartington City Hall and Auditorium
 Hartington Hall
 Hartington Road Halt railway station, Brighton, England
 Marquess of Hartington, subsidiary title held by the Duke of Devonshire